Sin Sze Si Ya Temple (also called as Sze Yah Temple) is a Chinese temple located at 14A Lebuh Pudu, close to the Central Market of Kuala Lumpur, Malaysia. It was built by Yap Ah Loy for two deities who guided him in the Selangor Civil War. The temple is the oldest Taoist temple in the city.

History 
The information board at the front entrance says the temple site was founded in 1864 by Kapitan Yap Ah Loy, dedicated to patron deities of Sin Sze Ya and Si Sze Ya. The deities has guided Yap to defeat the enemies and defend the town of Kuala Lumpur during the civil war from 1870–1873, with the two patron deities are actually based on two real persons of Sheng Meng Li (Kapitan of Sungai Ujong) and Chung Lai (Yap loyal lieutenant). The temple structures was finally built in 1883.

References

External links 
 

Chinese-Malaysian culture in Kuala Lumpur
Taoist temples in Malaysia
Religious buildings and structures in Kuala Lumpur
Religious buildings and structures completed in 1883